LouisLouise  is a Flemish soap opera based on the Argentine success Lalola format and has been broadcast since 24 September 2008 on vtm. It is the successor of the series Sara.

Story
Louis (Axel Daeseleire) is a successful editor of the men's magazine Don. He feels like he is the boss of the universe, until he bumps into Eva (Véronique Leysen). He convinces her into sleeping with him, dumps her and then continues his life. Eva can't accept this, and asks her best friend, Babs (Lotte Mariën) for advice. She speaks an occult curse on him, not aware that on this night, a special cosmic constellation of planets takes place. That night, Louis is transformed into a woman. When he wakes up, he panics. His roommate and best friend, Charlotte De Wilde (Ianka Fleerackers), convinces him to go to the editors disguised as Louise, the niece of Louis, and do a very important presentation for investors of Uitgeverij Hercules, the company behind the magazine Don.

When his boss, Vic Mutsaerts (Rudy Morren), tries to call Louis, he is surprised to get Charlotte on the line instead. She quickly lies and says that Louis had to leave for his sick father in Canada, and that his cousin and confidant Louise will lead the meeting.

Louis has to go through life as a woman now. Louise (Hilde De Baerdemaeker) turns out to be a beautiful woman and finds out what it's like to be a woman in modern society. Louis faces that Louise is not often taken seriously and doesn't know what to do. Charlotte introduces Louise to the world of women, with little success. Tasks such as walking on high heels and forgetting about her manly principles seem impossible. By trial and error, she learns the disadvantages of women, but also the benefits. Louis then has to make a decision of staying a woman or changing back to a man, which is made difficult by the fact that his Louise ego has fallen in love with a man.

2008 telenovelas
2008 Belgian television series debuts
2009 Belgian television series endings
Flemish television shows
Belgian drama television shows
2000s Belgian television series
Belgian fantasy television series
VTM (TV channel) original programming